Frieda Thenu (November 24, 1938 – October 15, 1977), better known by the stage name Farida Arriany, was an Indonesian actress, model, and singer. She was named the most successful Indonesian film star in 1960s.

In October 1977, Arriany was hospitalized in Jakarta. She later died on October 15, 1977, at the age of 38.

Early life 

Farida Arriany was born Frieda Thenu on November 24, 1938, in Bandung, West Java. She completed a junior high school education.

Personal life 
Farida Arriany died in Jakarta, Indonesia on October 15, 1977, at the age of 38.

Career 
She made her feature film debut in 1955, taking the role of Sari in Golden Arrow's Kasih Ibu (A Mother's Love). She was credited as Farida Shagniarty in this film, only taking the stage name Farida Arriany some time later. She appeared in eighteen further films in the following six years.

In the early 1960s, Arriany established her own film company, the Farida Arriany Film Corporation. JB Kristanto's Indonesian film catalogue lists the company as only producing a single film,  (We Wake Tomorrow, 1963); this was the first Indonesian film shot with CinemaScope. In his encyclopedia of film figures, however, Misbach Yusa Biran writes that the company completed two films, as well as Road to Bali (1968), a collaborative project with Japan.

During the mid-1960s Arriany was inactive from film acting. She made her return in 1969, taking two roles that year: as a singer in Sjumandjaja's Apa Jang Kau Tjari, Palupi? (What Are You Seeking, Palupi?) and in Wim Umboh's Laki-Laki Tak Bernama (Man Without a Name). Over the next eight years she took numerous supporting roles, including in Lewat Tengah Malam (After Midnight, 1971), Salah Asuhan (Wrong Upbringing, 1972), and Menanti Kelahiran (Awaiting Birth, 1977).

Arriany was an active promoter of tourism. She was also involved in an organisation supporting older actors. Her term would have ended in 1978.

Filmography
During her twenty-two-year career, Arriany appeared in more than forty films.

Kasih Ibu (1955)
Gambang Semarang (1955)
Sampai Berdjumpa Kembali (1955)
Melati Sendja (1956)
Tudjuan (1956)
Air Mata Ibu (1957)
Anakku Sajang (1957) 
Bermain Api (1957)
Arriany (1958)
Bunga dan Samurai (1958) 
Titi-Tito (1958)
Wanita Indonesia (1958)
Laki-laki Tak Bernama (1969)
Apa jang Kau Tjari, Palupi? (1969) 
Ajam den Lapeh (1960)
Istana yang Hilang (1960) 
Pedjuang (1960)
Tugas Baru Inspektur Rachman (1960)
Badja Membara (Nila Meulila) (1961) 
Seribu Langkah (1000 Langkah) (1961)
Sungai Ular (1961)
Dendam Berdarah (1970)
Djalang (1970)
Hidup, Tjinta dan Air Mata (1970)
Lewat Tengah Malam (1971)
Impas (0 x 0) (1971)
Sanrego (1971)
Tjisadane (1971)
Njanjian Air Mata (1972)
Salah Asuhan (1972)
Anak Yatim (1973)
Pelarian (1973)
Sebatang Kara (1973)
Benyamin Si Abunawas (1974)
Melawan Badai (1974)
Fajar Menyingsing (1975)
Aladin Agen Rahasia (1975)
Menanti Kelahiran (1976)
Noda dan Asmara (1977)
Senyum Nona Anna (1977)
Yoan (1977)

References

Footnotes

Works cited

External links

 

1938 births
1977 deaths
Indonesian film actresses
People from Bandung
Citra Award winners